Zimmerman House may refer to:

in the United States (by state then city)
Zimmerman House (Studio City, California), designed by architect John Lautner
S.T. Zimmerman House, Lawrence, Kansas, NRHP-listed 
Williams-Warren-Zimmerman House, Terre Haute, Indiana, NRHP-listed
Zimmerman House (Manchester, New Hampshire), a Frank Lloyd Wright-designed house, NRHP-listed
Zimmerman House (Horseheads, New York), NRHP-listed
Heyne-Zimmerman House, Columbus, Ohio, NRHP-listed in Columbus
Mead-Zimmerman House, Greenwich, Ohio, NRHP-listed in Huron County, Ohio
Ezekiel B. Zimmerman Octagon House, Marshallville, Ohio, NRHP-listed
Jacob Zimmerman House, Gresham, Oregon, NRHP-listed
Walter S. Zimmerman House, Portland, Oregon, NRHP-listed
Zimmerman-Rudeen House, Portland, Oregon, NRHP-listed
Marie Zimmermann Farm, Milford, Pennsylvania, NRHP-listed
Daniel B. Zimmerman Mansion, Somerset, Pennsylvania, NRHP-listed
Zimmerman House (Columbia, South Carolina), NRHP-listed
Minnie Zulch Zimmerman House, Bryan, Texas, NRHP-listed in Brazos County, Texas